Optoturris is an extinct genus of sea snails, marine gastropod mollusks in the family Turridae.

Species
Species within the genus Optoturris include:
 † Optoturris editus A.W.B. Powell, 1944
 † Optoturris optatus (G.F. Harris, 1897)
 † Optoturris kyushuensis Shuto, 1961 - Japan (Lower Pliocene)
 † Optoturris paracanthus (Tenison-Woods, 1877)

References

 A.W.B. Powell, The Australian Tertiary Mollusca of the Family Turridae; Records of the Auckland Institute and Museum, Vol. 3, No. 1 (1944)

External links
 Harris G.F. (1897)   Catalogue of Tertiary Molluscs in the British Museum of Natural History
 Ludbrook, N. H. "Tertiary molluscan types from Table Cape in Tasmanian Museum, Hobart." Papers and Proceedings of the Royal Society of Tasmania. Vol. 101. 1967.
 Long, D. C. "LATE EOCENE AND EARLY OLIGOCENE TURRIDAE (GASTROPODA: PROSOBRANCHIATA) OF THE BROWN'S CREEK."
  Squires, Don. "A Catalogue in the Tasmanian Museum and Art Gallery" (2012).

Turridae